WVRN-TV, UHF analog channel 63, was an independent television station licensed to Richmond, Virginia, United States. It was on the air from November 24, 1984 to September 8, 1988, first as a religious station, then a general entertainment independent station.

History
The Christian Broadcasting Network received a construction permit for a television station in Richmond on June 27, 1980. The station, which took the WRNX call sign, was to adopt a general entertainment format with cartoons, sitcoms and westerns, as well as religious shows, similar to its other independent stations, including flagship WYAH-TV in Hampton Roads (now WGNT). It was also to run Pat Robertson's The 700 Club three times a day.

However, in 1982, CBN sold WRNX to National Capital Christian Broadcasting, owner of WTKK in Manassas, Virginia, for $34,500. National Capital launched the station on November 24, 1984 as WTLL, airing religious programming previously shown on WRLH-TV. The format featured such Christian programming as The PTL Club, Jimmy Swaggart and many televangelists. For about 7 hours a day weekdays and Saturdays, WTLL featured a mix of classic sitcoms, westerns, and some children's programs, including some recent cartoons on weekdays. The station was about 60% Christian and 40% secular. On Sundays, the station only ran Christian programming.

National Capital sold WTLL to Sudbrink Broadcasting for $3 million on March 31, 1986. The station changed its call letters to WVRN-TV on April 28, and took on a full-time general entertainment format, competing directly against WRLH. However, Richmond wasn't big enough at the time to support two independent stations. As a result, both stations became increasingly unprofitable, and Sudbrink soon encountered financial problems for other reasons, filing for Chapter 11 bankruptcy in late 1986.

In September 1988, Act III Broadcasting, which had recently taken over WRLH-TV, bought WVRN's assets and merged WVRN's stronger programming onto WRLH's schedule. WVRN was then shut down and its license was returned to the FCC and deleted.

The original broadcasting tower in Midlothian, Virginia that had been used by WVRN is now owned by Motorola and leased as a transmitter tower by two separately owned local FM radio stations: Entercom-owned Urban station WBTJ and VPM Media Corporation-owned public radio station WBBT-FM.

References

VRN-TV
Television channels and stations established in 1984
1984 establishments in Virginia
Television channels and stations disestablished in 1988
1988 disestablishments in Virginia
Defunct television stations in the United States
VRN-TV